Pujan Uparkoti (born 9 May 1996) is a Nepalese footballer who plays as a midfielder for Nepali club Dhangadhi and the Nepal national team.

References

External links
 

Living people
1996 births
Nepalese footballers
Nepal international footballers
Association football midfielders